Eloísa Álvarez Oteo (8 July 1956 – 5 September 2017) was a Spanish politician.

Born in Muriel Viejo in 1956, she was trained as a nurse. Álvarez became spokesperson of the provincial deputation of Soria in 1991, serving until 1995, when she was elected to the Cortes of Castile and León. Álvarez stepped down in 1999 when she assumed the mayoralty of Soria until 2003. From 2004 to 2011, she was a member of the Congress of Deputies for Soria. Between 2011 and 2015, Álvarez represented Soria in the Senate.

References

1956 births
2017 deaths
21st-century Spanish women politicians
20th-century Spanish women politicians
Women mayors of places in Spain
Members of the 4th Cortes of Castile and León
Women members of the Congress of Deputies (Spain)
Members of the 8th Congress of Deputies (Spain)
Members of the 9th Congress of Deputies (Spain)
Members of the Senate of Spain
Spanish Socialist Workers' Party politicians
Spanish nurses